Yoshimoto may refer to:
Yoshimoto Kogyo, a Japan entertainment company

People with the given name
, Japanese weightlifter
Imagawa Yoshimoto, one of the leading daimyō (feudal lords) in the Sengoku period Japan
Nijō Yoshimoto, 14th-century Japanese poet

People with the surname
Banana Yoshimoto, pen name of Japanese writer Mahoko Yoshimoto
Hiroki Yoshimoto, Japanese race car driver
Kinji Yoshimoto (1966-2021), Japanese animator
Takaaki Yoshimoto, Japanese poet, literary critic, and philosopher

See also 
Yoshimoto Cube, a polyhedral mechanical puzzle toy invented in 1971

Japanese-language surnames
Japanese masculine given names